A-10 Tank Killer is a 1989 combat flight simulation video game for DOS developed and published by Dynamix. An Amiga version was released in 1990. The game features an A-10 Thunderbolt II attack aircraft. Following the success of Red Baron, version 1.5 was released in 1991 which included Gulf War missions and improved graphics and sounds. Several mission packs were sold separately. A sequel published by Sierra, Silent Thunder: A-10 Tank Killer II, was released in 1996.

Gameplay

The gameplay consists of the player piloting an A-10 Thunderbolt II "tank killer" through various combat missions set in the Gulf War air campaign as well as a fictional European scenario. The player receives a mission briefing, has the opportunity to customize a weapon load-out before starting the mission, and is debriefed after the mission.

Reception
According to Sierra On-Line, combined sales of A-10 Tank Killer and its sequel surpassed 250,000 units by the end of March 1996.

Computer Gaming World stated that "A-10 has much going for it" and gave it four stars out of five. The magazine recommended the game for those looking for quick fun, not "flight grognards" seeking realism. In a 1994 survey of wargames the magazine gave the title three-plus stars out of five, liking the graphics but noting the "very sensitive" joystick control. The DOS version of the game received 5 out of 5 stars in Dragon. Because of the violence level of A-10 Tank Killer, it has been placed on the "Index" in Germany and is not generally available to the public.

Reviews
The Games Machine (Feb, 1990)
Zzap! (Feb, 1991)
Génération 4 (Apr, 1990)
Zero (Apr, 1991)
Amiga Action (Jun, 1991)
Amiga Joker (Jan, 1991)
Amiga Power (Jul, 1991)
ASM (Aktueller Software Markt) (Nov, 1990)
Amiga Power (Aug, 1991)

See also
Red Baron (1990)
A-10 Attack! (1995)
A-10 Cuba! (1996)
Silent Thunder (1996)
Falcon 4.0 (1998)

References

External links
About the game

1989 video games
Amiga games
Combat flight simulators
DOS games
Video games developed in the United States
Dynamix games
Single-player video games